Mochtar Riady, (born 12 May 1929) also known as Lie Mon Tie, is an Indonesian financial magnate and the founder and chairman emeritus of Lippo Group. He was born in Malang to a Chinese Indonesian family. At five months old, his parents took him to his father's ancestral village in Fujian where he lived until he was six years old.

Early life
Riady's father was a batik trader named Liapi (1887-1959), while his mother was named Sibelau (1889-1937). Both of his parents migrated from Fujian and arrived in Malang in 1918.

References

External links

1929 births
Converts to Christianity from Buddhism
Living people
Indonesian billionaires
Indonesian businesspeople
Indonesian Christians
Indonesian people of Chinese descent
Nanjing University alumni
Indonesian Hokkien people